Skellefteå Innebandy IF  is a floorball club in Skellefteå, Sweden, established in 1986. The women's team debuted in the SSL in the 2006-2007 season.

References

External links
Officiell webbplats 

1986 establishments in Sweden
Sport in Skellefteå
Sports clubs established in 1986
Swedish floorball teams